Souleymane Diaby (born 10 September 1987 in Daloa) is an Ivorian footballer.

Career 
In 2007, Diaby joined Ukrainian club FC Krymteplytsia Molodizhne. In 2017, he joined the Ivorian Club, SC Gagnoa.

Club statistics

Updated to games played as of 18 August 2013.

References

External links

1987 births
Living people
People from Daloa
Ivorian footballers
Ivorian expatriate footballers
Association football forwards
Africa Sports d'Abidjan players
FC Krymteplytsia Molodizhne players
Budapest Honvéd FC players
Ukrainian First League players
Nemzeti Bajnokság I players
Expatriate footballers in Morocco
Expatriate footballers in Ukraine
Expatriate footballers in Hungary
Expatriate footballers in France
Ivorian expatriate sportspeople in Morocco
Ivorian expatriate sportspeople in Ukraine
Ivorian expatriate sportspeople in Hungary
Ivorian expatriate sportspeople in France